Nicklin is an electoral district of the Legislative Assembly in the Australian state of Queensland. The electorate is centred in the Sunshine Coast hinterland, and stretches north to Black Mountain, south to Palmwoods and Montville, and west to Kenilworth, including Conondale National Park. It includes notable localities such as Nambour, Yandina, Cooroy, Bli Bli, Mapleton and Woombye.

The seat is currently held by Robert Skelton of the Labor Party. In 2020 he succeeded LNP member Marty Hunt, who had only served one term in office. Prior to the election of Hunt, Nicklin was held by long serving Independent member, Peter Wellington. Wellington's first vote in Parliament was to decide who would form government, the election having left the Labor Party one seat short of a majority. Wellington backed the formation of a minority Beattie Labor government.

Members for Nicklin

 Election declared void by the Court of Disputed Returns

Election results

References

External links
 

Nicklin
Sunshine Coast, Queensland